Gadhavi (Hindi: गढ़वी; Gujarati: ગઢવી) is an honorific title of the Charans of Gujarat. In earlier times, as some Charans were owners or governors of forts, i.e. Gadh, they came to be known as Gadhavi. It is synonymous with Charan and is used as a surname. It is also spelled as Gadhvi or Gadvi.

Etymology 
The word Gadhavi has been derived from semi-Prakrit and semi-Sanskrit words Gadha (fort) and Pati (master), i.e. keeper of a fort. Masters of fort were called Gadhapatis which changed to Gadhavi through the Prakrit Gadna-vai.

Notable people 

 Isudan Gadhvi
 Jigardan Gadhavi
 Sanjay Gadhvi
 Kirtidan Gadhvi
 Bhikhudan Gadhvi
 Aditya Gadhvi
 Dadudan Gadhvi
 Mukesh Gadhvi
 B. K. Gadhvi
 Shambhudan Gadhvi
 Milind Gadhavi
 Pingalshi Brahmanand Gadhvi
 Hemu Gadhavi

References 

Surnames
Surnames of Indian origin
Gujarati people
Indian feudalism
Social groups of Gujarat
Charan
Gujarati-language surnames